The Central East Anatolia Region (Turkish: Ortadoğu Anadolu Bölgesi) (TRB) is a statistical region in Turkey.

Subregions and provinces 

 Malatya Subregion (TRB1)
 Malatya Province (TRB11)
 Elazığ Province (TRB12)
 Bingöl Province (TRB13)
 Tunceli Province (TRB14)
 Van Subregion (TRB2)
 Van Province (TRB21)
 Muş Province (TRB22)
 Bitlis Province (TRB23)
 Hakkâri Province (TRB24)

Age groups

Internal immigration

State register location of Central East Anatolia residents

Marital status of 15+ population by gender

Education status of 15+ population by gender

See also 
 NUTS of Turkey

References

External links 
 TURKSTAT

Sources 
 ESPON Database

Anatolia
Statistical regions of Turkey
Eastern Anatolia Region
Southeastern Anatolia Region